Nikola Krajinović (born 9 November 1999) is a Croatian football player who plays for FC Koper.

Club career
He made his Croatian First Football League debut for NK Lokomotiva on 26 May 2017 in a game against HNK Cibalia. On 4 January 2019, Krajinović was loaned out to NK Rudeš for the rest of the season. In summer 2019, he joined NK Osijek's reserve team.

References

External links
 

1999 births
Living people
Sportspeople from Karlovac
Association football wingers
Croatian footballers
Croatia youth international footballers
NK Lokomotiva Zagreb players
NK Rudeš players
NK Osijek players
NK Hrvatski Dragovoljac players
FC Koper players
Croatian Football League players
First Football League (Croatia) players
Slovenian PrvaLiga players
Croatian expatriate footballers
Expatriate footballers in Slovenia
Croatian expatriate sportspeople in Slovenia